= American Leadership and Policy Foundation =

American research organization

The American Leadership & Policy Foundation (ALPF) is a U.S. policy research organization and think-tank based in Kansas City, Missouri ALPF was founded in 2014 by David Stuckenberg with the assistance of Stephen Dupuis. As a civic foundation, ALPF aims to provide information and research to the general public and decision makers on issues relating to policy, as well as provides a training outlet for future leaders.

== Membership ==
ALPF is led by Founder and Chairman David Stuckenberg, Vice Chairman Stephen Dupuis, Board Member and Executive Secretary Dylan R. Bryant, and President of the Board David Liapis. Assisting in leadership are additional members of the Board of Directors consisting of Win Johnson, General Kenneth Chrosniak, and Dean A. Dohrman, Ph.D.; the Foundation also has a team of executive board members, organizational directors, and fellows.

ALPF has approximately 100 combined fellows and staff members. The foundation refers to its members as “fellows”, of which there are three levels: (1) Senior Fellows, (2) Full Fellows, and (3) Visiting Fellows.

== Policy Influence and Research ==
=== EMP Research ===
The group aims to provides evidence-based research on many topics, including potential threats that EMP may pose to the United States. In June 2015, ALPF published a report on Electromagnetic Pulse and Space Weather and the Strategic Threat to America's Nuclear Power Stations. The group's EMP research appears to have the support of Scott McBride, Idaho National Laboratory, Infrastructure Security, who stated, “I have reviewed the EMP & Space Weather and the Strategic Threat to America’s Nuclear Power Stations and found it to be an excellent presentation of what we know and what we don’t know about this very complex threat to all of our critical infrastructures, not just our nuclear stations.”

The group claims their EMP research illustrates that the United States is not currently prepared for an EMP attack that could affect the U.S. nuclear grid. John Ostrich, U.S. Department of Energy, described the group's research by stating, "Overall you have provided an interesting and detailed case for a problem (threats to nuclear power plants from GMD and EMP) that few have examined."

Dave Lochbaum, Union of Concern Scientists, claimed that the group's EMP paper "...is a well-researched and solid analysis of black swan events that could result in the next Fukushima disaster unless the hazards are sincerely considered and steps undertaken to responsibly manage the risks.”

In April 2016, ALPF co-hosted the first ever Texas Grid Security Summit with Texas State Senator Bob Hall. The summit was aimed at addressing "...the critical importance of protecting Texas from the threat of an EMP".

In October 2017, ALPF had its EMP research cited in a congressional report entitled "North Korea Nuclear EMP Attack: An Existential Threat" submitted by the Commission to Assess the Threat to the United States from Electromagnetic Pulse (EMP) Attack to the U.S. House of Representatives Committee on Homeland Security—Subcommittee on Oversight and Management Efficiency, urging Congress to take the threats posed to U.S. national security by a potential EMP strike seriously.

According to Dr. Peter Pry, Chief of Staff, Commission to Assess the Threat to the United States from Electromagnetic Pulse (EMP) Attack, “The independent study by ALPF supports the conclusions of the Congressional EMP Commission that nuclear reactors should receive high priority for EMP protection.”

=== Drone Research ===
ALPF was the first organization to publicly address the safety and security risks posed by drones. As a result, the FAA later adopted recommendations requiring registration of drones. A safety and security assessment on drones in the U.S. airspace developed by ALPF was reported on by the Harvard Law School National Security Journal.

=== Children Protected Against Radicalization ===
The group also aims to counteract violent extremism by conducting educational town halls across the country, holding educational workshops, and disseminating educational materials and program flyers as a part of an information campaign the group calls Children Protected from Radicalization (CPR).

== Prospectus ==
According to the foundation's prospectus, “ALPF abides by the rigorous code of ethics and practices established by the American Association of Public Opinion Research (AAPOR) AAPOR Home Page. Fellows are required to adhere to the ethics of their respective professional accreditation association and the foundation’s stringent bi-laws".

== Blue Papers ==
=== Novel High-Altitude Delivery Platforms for Weapons of Mass Destruction/ Effect ===
David Stuckenberg discusses the problems posed by new both developments in WMD's and in their supposed access to non-governmental organizations. Of primary discussion was the supposed effect on electrical infrastructure that nuclear weapons would have if detonated in the atmosphere.

=== Key Terminologies in Interdisciplinary Research as Applied Through Emergency Management ===
Herschel Campbell describes and defines the terminology utilized in interdisciplinary research and applies them to emergency management.

=== The Cascade Effect and Nature of Trust and Hierarchical Structures within the Context of Mass Casualty Incident Management Networks ===
Herschel Campbell, as a Global Security Operations Center Analyst, describes the importance of minimizing crisis by relying upon strong but flexible hierarchical structures.

=== The Benefits of Mitigation ===
Herschel Campbell, after looking at Hurricane Katrina argues that argues that mitigation strategies well worth the cost to create and conduct mitigation strategies when compared with the cost of reconstruction and rebuilding.

== Organization Structure ==
ALPF is a charity incorporated under U.S. IRS code 501(c)(3) as a non-partisan education foundation. The organization is also registered as a non-profit with the State of Missouri Secretary of State.
